Kholuzin (also Romanized as Kholūzīn, Khaloozīn, Khelowzīn, and Kholowzīn; also known as Klujīn) is a village in Deh Chal Rural District, in the Central District of Khondab County, Markazi Province, Iran. At the 2006 census, its population was 191, in 45 families.

References 

Populated places in Khondab County